Miss Bulgaria (Mis Balgariya) is a national beauty pageant in Bulgaria.

History
Miss Bulgaria is national beauty contest established in 1991. At the moment the license for the contest is property of Fashion and Model Agency "Intersound".

Titleholders
1990: Violeta Galabova
1991: Lyubomira Slavcheva
1992: Elena Draganova
1992: Neli Nenova (Neli Peycheva, Agency „Miss, Mrs & Mr“)
1993: Vyara Rusinova
1994: Stela Ognyanova
1995: Evgenia Kalkandzhieva - Top 10 Semi-Finalist Miss World 1995
1996: Vyara Kamenova (SOFIA)
1997: Elka Ivanova Traikova (SLIVNITSA) 
1998: Nataliya Gurkova (BANSKO)
1999: Elena Angelova	(SOFIA)
2001: Ivayla Bakalova
2002: Teodora Burgazlieva
2003: Iva Titova
2004: Gergana Guncheva 
2005: Rositsa Ivanova	
2006: Slavena Vatova
2007: Yuliya Yurevich
2009: Antonia Petrova
2010: Romina Andonova
2011: Vanya Peneva
2012: Gabriela Vasileva
2013: Nansi Karaboycheva
2014: Simona Evgenieva
2015: Marina Voykova
2016: Gabriela Kirova
2017: Tamara Georgieva
2018: Teodora Mudeva
2019: Radinela Chusheva
2020: Ventsislava Tafkova
2021: Sara Mladenova
2022: Alexandra Krasteva

References

See also
 Miss World Bulgaria
 Miss Universe Bulgaria

Beauty pageants in Bulgaria
Bulgarian awards